Joris August Odilius Ludovicus Vercammen (born 14 October 1952) served as the Old Catholic Archbishop of Utrecht of the Old Catholic Church of the Netherlands from 1 July 2000 to 11 January 2020.

Life and career
Vercammen was born in Lier, Belgium, in 1952. In 1979, he was ordained a priest for the Roman Catholic Diocese of Antwerp. In 1988, he left the Roman Catholic Church and was received into the Old Catholic Church of the Netherlands.

Vercammen was serving as rector of the Old Catholic seminary when clergy and laity of the archdiocese elected him as the 83rd Archbishop of Utrecht. He was consecrated on 1 July 2000 at St. Martin's Cathedral, Utrecht, once the see of Willibrord and his successors, but in the hands of the Dutch Reformed Church since 1580.
In 2006, the ninth Assembly of the World Council of Churches in Porto Alegre made Vercammen a member of its central committee.
On 19 September 2019, Vercammen announced that he would resign as Archbishop of Utrecht effective 11 January 2020.

Vercammen is married and has three children.

References

External links
Archbishop Joris Vercammen (WCC)

1952 births
Living people
Dutch Old Catholics
Dutch Old Catholic bishops
People from Lier, Belgium